Elisabeth of Bavaria (Elisabeth Amalie Eugenie; 24 December 1837 – 10 September 1898), nicknamed Sisi or Sissi, was Empress of Austria and Queen of Hungary from her marriage to Emperor Franz Joseph I on 24 April 1854 until her assassination in 1898.

Elisabeth was born into the royal Bavarian House of Wittelsbach but enjoyed an informal upbringing before marrying Emperor Franz Joseph I at the age of sixteen. The marriage thrust her into the much more formal Habsburg court life, for which she was unprepared and which she found uncongenial. Early in the marriage, she was at odds with her mother-in-law, Archduchess Sophie, who took over the rearing of Elisabeth's daughters, one of whom, Sophie, died in infancy. The birth of a son to the imperial couple, Crown Prince Rudolf, improved Elisabeth's standing at court, but her health suffered under the strain.  As a result, she would often visit Hungary for its more relaxed environment. She came to develop a deep kinship with Hungary and helped to bring about the dual monarchy of Austria-Hungary in 1867.

The death of Elisabeth's only son and his mistress Mary Vetsera in a murder–suicide at his hunting lodge at Mayerling in 1889 was a blow from which the Empress never recovered. She withdrew from court duties and travelled widely, unaccompanied by her family. In 1890, she had the palace Achilleion built on the Greek island of Corfu. The palace featured an elaborate mythological motif and served as a refuge, which Elisabeth visited often. She was obsessively concerned with maintaining her youthful figure and beauty. Elisabeth also developed a restrictive diet and she wore extremely tight-laced corsets to keep her waist very small.

In 1897, her sister, Sophie, died in an accidental fire at the Bazar de la Charité charity event in Paris. While travelling in Geneva in 1898, Elisabeth was stabbed in the heart by an Italian anarchist named Luigi Lucheni. Her tenure of 44 years was the longest of any Austrian empress.

Biography

Duchess in Bavaria

Born Elisabeth Amalie Eugenie on 24 December 1837 in Munich, Bavaria, she was the third child and second daughter of Duke Maximilian Joseph in Bavaria and Princess Ludovika of Bavaria, the half-sister of King Ludwig I of Bavaria. Maximilian was considered to be rather peculiar; he had a childish love of circuses and traveled the Bavarian countryside to escape his duties. The family's homes were the Herzog-Max-Palais in Munich during winter and Possenhofen Castle in the summer months, far from the protocols of court. "Sisi" and her siblings grew up in a very unrestrained and unstructured environment; she often skipped her lessons to go riding about the countryside.

In 1853, Princess Sophie of Bavaria, the domineering mother of 23-year-old Emperor Franz Joseph, preferring to have a niece as a daughter-in-law rather than a stranger, arranged a marriage between her son and her sister Ludovika's eldest daughter, Helene ("Néné"). Although the couple had never met, Franz Joseph's obedience was taken for granted by the archduchess, who was once described as "the only man in the Hofburg" for her authoritarian manner. The Duchess and Helene were invited to journey to the resort of Bad Ischl, Upper Austria to receive his formal proposal of marriage. The then fifteen year old Sisi accompanied her mother and sister, and they traveled from Munich in several coaches. They arrived late as the Duchess, prone to migraines, had to interrupt the journey; the coach with their gala dresses never did arrive. Before leaving for Bad Ischl, the Bavarian court had gone into mourning over the death of the Queen-Dowager's brother Georg so they were dressed in black and unable to change to more suitable clothing before meeting the young Emperor. While black did not suit eighteen year old Helene's dark coloring, by contrast, it made her younger sister's blonder looks more striking.

Helene was a pious, quiet young woman, and while she and Franz Joseph felt ill at ease in each other's company, he was instantly infatuated with her younger sister. He did not propose to Helene, but instead, he defied his mother and informed her that if he could not have Elisabeth, he would not marry at all. Five days later, their betrothal was officially announced. The couple was married eight months later in Vienna, at the Augustinerkirche, on 24 April 1854. The marriage was finally consummated three days later, and Elisabeth received a dower equal to US$240,000 today.

Empress of Austria

After enjoying an informal and unstructured childhood, Elisabeth, who was shy and introverted by nature, and more so among the stifling formality of Habsburg court life, had difficulty adapting to the Hofburg and its rigid protocols and strict etiquette. Within a few weeks, Elisabeth started to display health problems.  She experienced fits of coughing and became anxious and frightened whenever she had to descend a narrow or steep staircase.

She was surprised to learn she was pregnant and gave birth to her first child, a daughter, Archduchess Sophie of Austria (1855–1857), just ten months after her wedding. The elder Archduchess Sophie, who often referred to Elisabeth as “a silly young mother,” not only named the child (after herself), without consulting the mother, but she took complete charge of the baby, refusing to allow Elisabeth to breastfeed or otherwise care for her own child.  When a second daughter, Archduchess Gisela of Austria (1856–1932), was born a year later, the Archduchess took the baby away from Elisabeth as well.

The fact that she had not produced a male heir made Elisabeth increasingly unwanted in the palace. One day, she found a pamphlet on her desk with the following words underlined:

Her mother-in-law is generally considered to be the source of the malicious pamphlet even though there is no evidence supporting that claim. The accusation of political meddling referred to Elisabeth's influence on her husband regarding his Italian and Hungarian subjects. When she traveled to Italy with him, she persuaded him to think differently and treat political prisoners better. In 1857, Elisabeth visited Hungary for the first time with her husband and two daughters, and it left a deep and lasting impression upon her, which many historians attribute to the fact that in Hungary, she found a welcome respite from the constraints of Austrian court life. It was "the first time that Elisabeth had met with men of character in Franz Joseph's realm, and she became acquainted with an aristocratic independence that scorned to hide its sentiments behind courtly forms of speech... She felt her innermost soul reach out in sympathy to the proud, steadfast people of this land..." Unlike the Archduchess, who despised the Hungarians, Elisabeth felt such an affinity for them that she began to learn Hungarian. In turn, the country reciprocated in its adoration of her. Writing about his visit to Hungary in 1934, Patrick Leigh Fermor notes that Elisabeth's picture was "framed on desks and tables and grand pianos,” and that her love for Hungary and the Hungarians "was returned with interest and still declared, thirty-six years after her assassination, with all the ardour of Burke for Marie Antoinette."

This same trip proved tragic, as both of Elisabeth's children became ill. While Gisela recovered quickly, two-year-old Sophie grew steadily weaker before finally succumbing to her illness and passing away.  It is generally assumed today that she died of typhus. Her death pushed Elisabeth, who was already prone to bouts of melancholy, into periods of heavy depression, which would haunt her for the rest of her life. She turned away from her living daughter and began neglecting her. In December 1857, Elisabeth became pregnant for the third time, and her mother, who had been concerned about her daughter's physical and mental health, hoped that this new pregnancy would help her recover.

Physical regimen

At 173 cm (5 feet 8 inches), Elisabeth was unusually tall. Through fasting and exercise such as gymnastics and riding, she maintained her weight at approximately 50 kg (110 pounds) for most of her life.

In deep mourning after her daughter Sophie's death, Elisabeth refused to eat for days — a behavior that would reappear in later periods of melancholy and depression. Whereas she previously had supper with the family, she now began to avoid this; and if she did eat with them, she ate quickly and very little. Whenever her weight threatened to exceed fifty kilos, a "fasting cure" or "hunger cure" would follow, which involved almost complete fasting. Meat itself often filled her with disgust, so she either had the juice of half-raw beefsteaks squeezed into a thin soup, or else adhered to a diet of milk and eggs.

Elisabeth emphasised her extreme slenderness through the practice of "tight-lacing". During the peak period of 1859–60, which coincided with Franz-Joseph's political and military defeats in Italy, her sexual withdrawal from her husband after three pregnancies in rapid succession, and her losing battle with her mother-in-law for dominance in rearing her children, she reduced her waist to 40 cm (16 inches) in circumference. Corsets of the time were split-busk types, fastening up the front with hooks and eyes, but Elisabeth had more rigid, solid-front ones made in Paris out of leather, "like those of Parisian courtesans", probably to hold up under the stress of such strenuous lacing, "a proceeding which sometimes took quite an hour". The fact that "she only wore them for a few weeks" may indicate that even leather proved inadequate for her needs. Elisabeth's defiant flaunting of this exaggerated dimension angered her mother-in-law, who expected her to be pregnant continuously.

Although on her return to Vienna in August 1862, a lady-in-waiting reported that "she eats properly, sleeps well, and does not tight-lace anymore", her clothing from this time until her death still measured only 47 – 49.5 cm (18 ½ – 19 ½ inches) around the waist, which prompted the Prince of Hesse to describe her as "almost inhumanly slender". She developed a horror of fat women and transmitted this attitude to her youngest daughter, who was terrified when, as a little girl, she first met Queen Victoria.

In her youth Elisabeth followed the fashions of the age, which for many years were cage-crinolined hoop skirts, but when fashion began to change, she was at the forefront of abandoning the hoop skirt for a tighter and leaner silhouette. She disliked both expensive accoutrements and the protocol that dictated constant changes of clothing, preferring simple, monochromatic riding habit-like attire. She never wore petticoats or any other "underlinen", as they added bulk, and was often literally sewn into her clothes, to bypass waistbands, creases, and wrinkles and to further emphasize the "wasp waist" that became her hallmark.

The empress developed extremely rigorous and disciplined exercise habits. Every castle she lived in was equipped with a gymnasium; the Knights' Hall of the Hofburg was converted into one, mats and balance beams were installed in her bedchamber so that she could practise on them each morning, and the imperial villa at Ischl was fitted with gigantic mirrors so that she could correct every movement and position. She took up fencing in her 50s with equal discipline. A fervent horsewoman, she rode every day for hours on end, becoming probably the world's best, as well as best-known, female equestrian at the time. When, due to sciatica, she could no longer endure long hours in the saddle, she substituted walking, subjecting her attendants to interminable marches and hiking tours in all weather.

In the last years of her life, Elisabeth became even more restless and obsessive, weighing herself up to three times a day. She regularly took steam baths to prevent weight gain; by 1894 she had wasted away to near emaciation, reaching her lowest point of 95.7 lbs (43.5 kg). There were some aberrations in Elisabeth's diet that appear to be signs of binge eating, On one occasion in 1878 the Empress astonished her travelling companions when she unexpectedly visited a restaurant incognito, where she drank champagne, ate a broiled chicken and an Italian salad, and finished with a "considerable quantity of cake". She may have satisfied her urge to binge in secret on other occasions; in 1881 she purchased an English country house and had a spiral staircase built from her living room into the kitchen, so that she could reach it in private.

It has been suggested by historians that these habits indicate a restrictive eating disorder. Walter Vandereycken, a professor of psychology, has stated that: "numerous documents repeatedly describe her considerable fear of weight gain and the psychopathological changes specific for anorexia nervosa."

Beauty

She is known as one of the most beautiful and famous women of 19th century Europe. In addition to her rigorous exercise regimen, Elisabeth practiced demanding beauty routines. Daily care of her abundant and extremely long hair, which in time turned from the dark blonde of her youth to chestnut brunette, took at least three hours. Her hair was so long and heavy that she often complained that the weight of the elaborate double braids and pins gave her headaches. Her hairdresser, Franziska Feifalik, was originally a stage hairdresser at the Wiener Burgtheater. Responsible for all of Elisabeth's ornate hairstyles, she generally accompanied her on her wanderings. Feifalik was forbidden to wear rings and required to wear white gloves; after hours of dressing, braiding, and pinning up the Empress' tresses, the hairs that fell out had to be presented in a silver bowl to her reproachful empress for inspection. When her hair was washed with a combination of eggs and cognac once every two weeks, all activities and obligations were cancelled for that day. Before her son's death, she tasked Feifalik with tweezing gray hairs away, but at the end of her life her hair was described as "abundant, though streaked with silver threads".

Elisabeth used these captive hours during grooming to learn languages; she spoke fluent English and French, and added modern Greek to her Hungarian studies. Her Greek tutor, Constantin Christomanos, described the ritual:

Elisabeth used cosmetics and perfume sparingly, as she wished to showcase her natural beauty. On the other hand, to preserve her beauty, she tested countless beauty products prepared either in the court pharmacy or by a lady-in-waiting in her own apartments. She appeared to favor "Crème Céleste" (compounded from white wax, spermaceti, sweet almond oil, and rosewater), but preferred a wide variety of facial tonics and waters.

Her night and bedtime rituals were just as demanding. Elisabeth slept without a pillow on a metal bedstead, which she believed was better for retaining and maintaining her upright posture; either raw veal or crushed strawberries lined her nightly leather facial mask. She was also heavily massaged, and often slept with cloths soaked in either violet- or cider-vinegar above her hips to preserve her slim waist; her neck was wrapped with cloths soaked in Kummerfeld-toned washing water. To further preserve her skin tone, she took both a cold shower every morning (which in later years aggravated her arthritis) and an olive-oil bath in the evening.

Elisabeth had an aversion to being photographed, especially later in her life, and was quick with a fan or sunshade to prevent her portrait being taken.

Marriage

Franz Joseph was passionately in love with his wife, but they had a very complex relationship later on in their lives. He was a stolid and sober man, a political conservative who was still guided by his mother and her adherence to the strict Spanish Court ceremony regarding both his public and domestic life, whereas Elisabeth inhabited a different world altogether. Restless to the point of hyperactivity, naturally introverted, and emotionally distant from her husband as she got  much older, she fled him as well as her duties of life at court, avoiding them both as much as she could. He indulged her wanderings, but constantly and unsuccessfully tried to tempt her into a more domestic life with him.

Elisabeth slept very little and spent hours reading and writing at night, and even took up smoking, a shocking habit for women which made her the further subject of already avid gossip. She had a special interest in history, philosophy, and literature, and developed a profound reverence for the German lyric poet and radical political thinker Heinrich Heine, whose letters she collected.

She tried to make a name for herself by writing Heine-inspired poetry. Referring to herself as Titania, William Shakespeare's Fairy Queen, Elisabeth expressed her intimate thoughts and desires in a large number of romantic poems, which served as a type of secret diary. Most of her poetry relates to her journeys, classical Greek and romantic themes, and ironic commentary on the Habsburg dynasty. Her wanderlust is defined by her own work:

Elisabeth was an emotionally complex woman, and perhaps due to the melancholy and eccentricity that was considered a given characteristic of her Wittelsbach lineage (the best-known member of the family being her favorite cousin, the eccentric Ludwig II of Bavaria), she was interested in the treatment of the mentally ill. In 1871, when the Emperor asked her what she would like as a gift for her Saint's Day, she listed a young tiger and a medallion, but: "...a fully equipped lunatic asylum would please me most".

Birth of a son

On 21 August 1858, Elisabeth finally gave birth to an heir, Rudolf (1858–1889). The 101-gun salute announcing the welcome news to Vienna also signaled an increase in her influence at court. This, combined with her sympathy toward Hungary, made Elisabeth an ideal mediator between the Magyars and the emperor. Her interest in politics had developed as she matured; she was liberal-minded, and placed herself decisively on the Hungarian side in the increasing conflict of nationalities within the empire.

Elisabeth was a personal advocate for Hungarian Count Gyula Andrássy, who also was rumored to be her lover. Whenever difficult negotiations broke off between the Hungarians and the court, they were resumed with her help. During these protracted dealings, Elisabeth suggested to the emperor that Andrássy be made the Premier of Hungary as part of a compromise, and in a forceful attempt to bring the two men together, strongly admonished her husband:

When Elisabeth was still blocked from controlling her son's upbringing and education, she openly rebelled. Due to her nervous attacks, fasting cures, severe exercise regime, and frequent fits of coughing, the state of her health had become so alarming that in October 1860 she was reported to suffer not only from "green-sickness", but also from physical exhaustion. A serious lung complaint of "Lungenschwindsucht" (tuberculosis) was feared by Joseph Škoda, a lung specialist, who advised a stay on Madeira. During this time, the court was rife with malicious rumors that Franz Joseph was having a [liaison with an actress named Frau Roll.

Elisabeth seized on the excuse and left her husband and children, to spend the winter in seclusion. Six months later, a mere four days after her return to Vienna, she again experienced coughing fits and fever. She ate hardly anything and slept badly, and Škoda observed a recurrence of her lung disease. A fresh rest cure was advised, this time on Corfu, where she improved almost immediately. If her illnesses were psychosomatic, abating when she was removed from her husband and her duties, her eating habits were causing physical problems as well. In 1862 she had not seen Vienna for a year when her family physician, Fischer of Munich, examined her and observed serious anemia and signs of "dropsy". Her feet were sometimes so swollen that she could walk only laboriously, and with the support of others. On medical advice, she went to Bad Kissingen for a cure. Elisabeth recovered quickly at the spa, but instead of returning home to assuage the gossip about her absence she spent more time with her own family in Bavaria. In August 1862, after a two-year absence, she returned shortly before her husband's birthday, but immediately suffered from a violent migraine and vomited four times en route, which might support a theory that some of her complaints were stress-related and psychosomatic.

Rudolf was now four years old, and Franz Joseph hoped for another son to safeguard the succession. Fischer claimed that the health of the empress would not permit another pregnancy, and she would regularly have to go to Kissingen for a cure. Elisabeth fell into her old pattern of escaping boredom and dull court protocol through frequent walking and riding, using her health as an excuse to avoid both official obligations and sexual intimacy. Preserving her youthful appearance was also an important influence in her avoidance of pregnancies: "Children are the curse of a woman, for when they come, they drive away Beauty, which is the best gift of the gods."

She was now more assertive in her defiance of her husband and mother-in-law than before, openly opposing them on the subject of the military education of Rudolf, who, like his mother, was extremely sensitive and not suited to the life at court.

Hungarian coronation

After having used every excuse to avoid pregnancy, Elisabeth later decided that she wanted a fourth child. Her decision was at once a deliberate personal choice and a political negotiation: by returning to the marriage, she ensured that Hungary, with which she felt an intense emotional alliance, would gain an equal footing with Austria.

The Austro-Hungarian Compromise of 1867 created the dual monarchy of Austria-Hungary. Andrássy was made the first Hungarian prime minister and in return, he saw that Franz Joseph and Elisabeth were officially crowned King and Queen of Hungary in June.

In the next year, Elisabeth lived primarily in Gödöllő and Buda-Pest, leaving her neglected and resentful Austrian subjects to trade rumors that if the infant she was expecting were a son, she would name him Stephen, after the patron saint and first king of Hungary. The issue was avoided when she gave birth to a daughter, Marie Valerie (1868–1924). Dubbed the "Hungarian child", she was born in Buda-Pest ten months after her parents' coronation and baptised there in April. Determined to bring this last child up by herself, Elisabeth finally had her way. She poured all her repressed maternal feelings on her youngest daughter to the point of nearly smothering her. Sophie's influence over Elisabeth's children and the court faded, and she died in 1872.

Travels

After having achieved this victory, Elisabeth did not stay to enjoy it, but instead embarked on a life of travel, and saw little of her children. "If I arrived at a place and knew that I could never leave it again, the whole stay would become hell despite being paradise". After her son's death, she commissioned the building of a palace on the Island of Corfu which she named the Achilleion, after Homer's hero Achilles in The Iliad. After her death, the building was purchased by German Emperor Wilhelm II. Later it was acquired by the nation of Greece (now Greek National Tourism Organization) and converted to a museum.

Newspapers published articles on her passion for riding sports, diet and exercise regimens, and fashion sense. She often shopped at the Budapest fashion house, Antal Alter (now Alter és Kiss), which had become very popular with the fashion-crazed crowd. Newspapers also reported on a series of reputed lovers. Although there is no verifiable evidence of her having an affair, one of her alleged lovers was George "Bay" Middleton, a dashing Anglo-Scot. He had been named as the probable lover of Lady Henrietta Blanche Hozier and father of Clementine Ogilvy Hozier (the wife of Winston Churchill). To prevent him from becoming lonely during her long absences, Elisabeth encouraged her husband Franz Joseph's close relationship with actress Katharina Schratt.

On her journeys, Elisabeth sought to avoid all public attention and crowds of people. She was mostly travelling incognito, using pseudonyms like 'Countess of Hohenembs'. Elisabeth also refused to meet European monarchs when she did not feel like it. On her high-speed walking tours, which lasted several hours, she was mostly accompanied by her Greek language tutors or her ladies-in-waiting. Countess Irma Sztáray, her last lady-in-waiting, describes the reclusive and highly sensitive empress as a natural, liberal and modest character, as a good listener and keen observer with great intellect.

Almost all of the ten readers who accompanied Elisabeth on her journeys were in their mid-twenties and of Greek origin. The most famous one was Constantin Christomanos, a future playwright and theater director, whose memoirs of Elisabeth were banned by the Viennese court. The others were the lawyer Nikos Thermoyanis, Roussos Roussopoulos, who thanks to Elisabeth became an honorary consul in Budapest, Constantin Manos, who became a resistance fighter against the Turks in Crete, and Marinos Marinaky, a future sportsman and co-founder of the famous Greek football club Panathinaikos. The last tutor who accompanied the Empress was the English-Greek Frederic Barker. He also served as a middleman for negotiations to sell the Achilleion Palace on Corfu. After Sisi's death Barker continued to stay in touch with the imperial family and became a freemason. On her voyages Elisabeth was also accompanied by a Swedish therapist, Arvid Ludvig Kellgren, to whom she even wrote romantic poetry.

Mayerling incident

In 1889, Elisabeth's life was shattered by the death of her only son Rudolf, who was found dead together with his young lover Baroness Mary Vetsera, in what was suspected to be a murder-suicide on Rudolf's part. The scandal was known as the Mayerling incident after the location of Rudolf's hunting lodge in Lower Austria, where they were found.

Elisabeth never recovered from the tragedy, sinking further into melancholy. Within a few years, she had lost her father, Max Joseph (in 1888), her only son, Rudolf (1889), her sister Duchess Sophie in Bavaria (1897), Helene (1890) and her mother, Ludovika (1892). After Rudolf's death she was thought to have dressed only in black for the rest of her life, although a light blue and cream dress discovered by The Hofburg's Sisi Museum dates to this time. To compound her losses, Count Gyula Andrássy died a year later, on 18 February 1890. "My last and only friend is dead," she lamented. Marie Valerie declared, "...she clung to him with true and steadfast friendship as she did perhaps, to no other person."
The Mayerling scandal increased public interest in Elisabeth, and she continued to be an icon and a sensation in her own right wherever she went. She wore long black dresses that could be buttoned up at the bottom, and carried a white parasol made of leather in addition to a concealing fan to hide her face from the curious.

Elisabeth spent little time in Vienna with her husband. Their correspondence increased during their last years, however, and their relationship became a warm friendship. On her imperial steamer, Miramar, Empress Elisabeth travelled through the Mediterranean. Her favourite places were Cape Martin on the French Riviera, and also Sanremo on the Ligurian Riviera, where tourism had started only in the second half of the nineteenth century; Lake Geneva in Switzerland; Bad Ischl in Austria, where the imperial couple would spend the summer; and Corfu. The Empress also visited countries not usually visited by European royals at the time: Morocco, Algeria, Malta, Turkey, and Egypt. The Emperor was hoping that his wife would finally settle down in her palace Achilleion on Corfu, but Sisi soon lost interest in the fairytale property. The endless travels became a means of escape for Elisabeth from her life and her misery.

Assassination

In 1898, despite warnings of possible assassination attempts, the 60-year-old Elisabeth traveled incognito to Geneva, Switzerland. However, someone from the Hôtel Beau-Rivage revealed that the Empress of Austria was their guest.

At 1:35 p.m. on Saturday 10 September 1898, Elisabeth and Countess Irma Sztáray de Sztára et Nagymihály, her lady-in-waiting, left the hotel on the shore of Lake Geneva on foot to catch the steamship Genève for Montreux. Since the empress despised processions, she insisted that they walk without the other members of her entourage.

They were walking along the promenade when the 25-year-old Italian anarchist Luigi Lucheni approached them, attempting to peer underneath the empress's parasol. According to Sztáray, as the ship's bell announced the departure, Lucheni seemed to stumble and made a movement with his hand, as if he wanted to maintain his balance.

Lucheni originally planned to kill the Duke of Orléans, but the pretender to France's throne had left Geneva earlier for the Valais. Failing to find him, the assassin selected Elisabeth when a Geneva newspaper revealed that the elegant woman traveling under the pseudonym of "Countess of Hohenembs" was the Empress Elisabeth of Austria.

After Lucheni struck her, the empress collapsed. A coach driver helped her to her feet and alerted the Austrian concierge of the Beau-Rivage, a man named Planner, who had been watching the progress the Empress made toward the Genève. The Empress then lost consciousness and collapsed next to her. Sztáray called for a doctor, but only a former nurse, a fellow passenger, was available. The boat's captain, Captain Roux, was ignorant of Elisabeth's identity, and since it was very hot on deck, he advised the countess to disembark and take her companion back to her hotel. Meanwhile, the boat was already sailing out of the harbor. Three men carried Elisabeth to the top deck and laid her on a bench. Sztáray opened her dress and cut Elisabeth's corset laces so she could breathe. Elisabeth revived somewhat and when Sztáray asked her if she was in pain, she replied, "No". She then asked, "What has happened?" and lost consciousness again.

Countess Sztáray noticed a small brown stain above the left breast of the Empress.  Alarmed that Elisabeth had not recovered consciousness, she informed the captain of her identity, and the boat turned back to Geneva. Elisabeth was carried back to the Hotel Beau-Rivage by six sailors on a stretcher improvised from a sail, cushions and two oars. Fanny Mayer, the wife of the hotel director, a visiting nurse, and the countess undressed Elisabeth and removed her shoes, at which point Sztáray noticed a few small drops of blood and a small wound. When they then removed her from the stretcher to the bed, she was clearly dead. Frau Mayer believed the two audible breaths she heard the Empress take as she was brought into the room were her last. Two doctors, Dr. Golay and Dr. Mayer arrived, along with a priest, who was too late to grant her absolution. Mayer incised the artery of her left arm to ascertain death and found no blood. She was pronounced dead at 2:10 p.m. Everyone knelt down and prayed for the repose of her soul, and Countess Sztáray closed Elisabeth's eyes and joined her hands. Elisabeth had been the Empress of Austria for 44 years.
 
When Franz Joseph received the telegram informing him of Elisabeth's death, his first fear was that her death was caused by suicide. It was only when a later message arrived, detailing the assassination, that he was reassured on that point. The telegram asked permission to perform an autopsy, and the response was that whatever procedures were prescribed should be adhered to.

The autopsy was performed the next day by Golay, who discovered that the weapon, which had not yet been found, had penetrated  into Elisabeth's thorax, fractured the fourth rib, pierced the lung and pericardium, and penetrated the heart from the top before coming out the base of the left ventricle. Because of the sharpness and thinness of the file, the wound was very narrow and, due to pressure from Elisabeth's extremely tight corseting, the hemorrhage of blood into the pericardial sac around the heart was slowed to mere drops. Until this sac filled, a medical emergency known as cardiac tamponade, the beating of her heart was not impeded, which is why Elisabeth had been able to walk from the site of the assault and up the boat's boarding ramp. Had the weapon not been removed, she would have lived a while longer, as it would have acted like a plug to stop the bleeding.

Golay photographed the wound but turned the photograph over to the Swiss Procurator-General, who had it destroyed, on the orders of Franz Joseph, along with the autopsy instruments.

As Geneva shuttered itself in mourning, Elisabeth's body was placed in a triple coffin: two inner ones of lead, the third exterior one in bronze, reposing on lion claws. On Tuesday, before the coffins were sealed, Franz Joseph's official representatives arrived to identify the body. The coffin was fitted with two glass panels, covered with doors, which could be slid back to allow her face to be seen.

On Wednesday morning, Elisabeth's body was carried back to Vienna aboard a funeral train. The inscription on her coffin read, "Elisabeth, Empress of Austria.” The Hungarians were outraged, and the words, "and Queen of Hungary" were hastily added. The entire Austro-Hungarian Empire was in deep mourning; 82 sovereigns and high-ranking nobles followed her funeral cortege on the morning of 17 September to the tomb in the Capuchin Church.

Aftermath

After the attack, Lucheni fled down the Rue des Alpes, where he threw the file into the entrance to No. 3. He was caught by two cabdrivers and a sailor, then secured by a gendarme. The weapon was found the next day by the concierge during his morning cleaning; he thought it belonged to a laborer who had moved the day before and did not notify the police of his discovery until the following day. There was no blood on the file and the tip was broken off, which occurred when Lucheni threw it away. The file was so dull in appearance it was speculated that it had been deliberately selected because it would be less noticeable than a shiny knife, which would have given Lucheni away as he approached. Lucheni had planned to purchase a stiletto, but lacking the price of 12 francs he had simply sharpened an old file into a homemade dagger and cut down a piece of firewood into a handle.

Although Lucheni boasted that he acted alone, because many political refugees found a haven in Switzerland, the possibility that he was part of a plot and that the life of the emperor was also in danger was considered. Once it was discovered that an Italian was responsible for Elisabeth's murder, unrest swept Vienna and reprisals were threatened against Italians. The intensity of shock, mourning, and outrage far exceeded that which occurred at the news of Rudolf's death. An outcry also immediately erupted over the lack of protection for the empress. The Swiss police had been well aware of her presence, and telegrams to the appropriate authorities advising them to take all precautions had been dispatched. Police Chief Virieux of the Canton of Vaud had organized Elisabeth's protection, but she had detected his officers outside the hotel the day before the assassination and protested that the surveillance was disagreeable, so Virieux had no choice but to withdraw them. It is also possible that if Elisabeth had not dismissed her other attendants that day, an entourage larger than one lady-in-waiting could have discouraged Lucheni, who had been following the Empress for several days, awaiting an opportunity.

Lucheni was brought before the Geneva Court in October. Furious that the death sentence had been abolished in Geneva, he demanded that he be tried according to the laws of the Canton of Lucerne, which still had the death penalty, signing the letter: "Luigi Lucheni, anarchist, and one of the most dangerous".

Since Elisabeth was famous for preferring the common man to courtiers, known for her charitable works, and considered such a blameless target, Lucheni's sanity was questioned initially. Elisabeth's will stipulated that a large part of her jewel collection should be sold and the proceeds, then estimated at over £600,000, were to be applied to various religious and charitable organizations. Franz Joseph remarked to Prince Liechtenstein, who was the couple's devoted equerry, "That a man could be found to attack such a woman, whose whole life was spent in doing good and who never injured any person, is to me incomprehensible". Everything outside of the crown jewels and state property that Elisabeth had the power to bequeath was left to her granddaughter, the Archduchess Elisabeth, Rudolf's child.

Lucheni was declared to be sane, but was tried as a common murderer, not a political criminal. Incarcerated for life, and denied the opportunity to make a political statement by his action, he attempted to kill himself with the sharpened key from a tin of sardines on 20 February 1900. Ten years later, he hanged himself with his belt in his cell on the evening of 16 October 1910, after a guard confiscated his uncompleted memoirs.

Legacy

Upon her death, Franz Joseph founded the Order of Elizabeth in memory of her.

In the Volksgarten of Vienna, there is an elaborate memorial monument featuring a seated statue of the Empress by Hans Bitterlich, dedicated on 4 June 1907. 

This town is between Montreux and Chateau Chillon; the inscription mentions her many visits to the area.

Near the location of her assassination at Quai du Mont-Blanc on the shore of Lake Geneva, there is a statue in memoriam, created by Philip Jackson and dedicated in 1998 on the 100th anniversary of the assassination.

A large number of chapels were named in her honour, connecting her to Saint Elisabeth. Various parks were named after her, such as the Empress Elisabeth Park in Meran, South Tyrol.

Various residences that Elisabeth frequented are preserved and open to the public, including her Imperial Hofburg apartment and the Schönbrunn Palace in Vienna, the Hermesvilla in the Vienna Woods, the Imperial Villa in Bad Ischl, the Achilleion on the Island of Corfu, and her summer residence in Gödöllő, Hungary. Her childhood family summer residence, Possenhofen Castle, houses the Empress Elizabeth Museum. The Empress's specially built railway sleeping car is on display at the Technisches Museum in Vienna.

Several sites in Hungary are named after her: two of Budapest's districts, Erzsébetváros and Pesterzsébet, and Elisabeth Bridge.

In the village Gastouri on the Greek island of Corfu a fountain is named after Elisabeth. The Empress had donated the "Fountain under the Sycamores" for the locals. It was festively inaugurated in 1894 by the church dignitaries and later named "Elisabeth Fountain".

Empress Elisabeth and the Empress Elisabeth Railway (West railway) named after her were recently selected as a main motif for a high value collector coin, the Empress Elisabeth Western Railway commemorative coin.

In 1998, Gerald Blanchard stole the Koechert Diamond Pearl known as the Sisi Star, a 10-pointed star of diamonds fanning out around one enormous pearl from an exhibit commemorating the 100th anniversary of her assassination at the Schönbrunn Palace in Vienna. It was one of approximately 27 jewel-encrusted pieces designed and made by court jeweler Jakob Heinrich Köchert for her to wear in her hair, which appears in a portrait of her by Franz Xaver Winterhalter. The Star was recovered by Canadian Police in 2007 and eventually returned to Austria. Although Blanchard possessed the priceless jewel, no one was ever formally charged with stealing it. Two versions of the stars were created: a second type without a pearl center, was designed by court jeweller Rozet & Fischmeister. Some stars were given to ladies of the court. One set of 27 diamond stars was kept in the Imperial family; they are seen in a photograph that shows the dowry of Rudolf's daughter, Archduchess Elisabeth, known as "Erzsi", on the occasion of her wedding to Prince Otto of Windisch-Graetz in 1902.

There are several statues of Empress Elisabeth in Slovakia: bronze statue by Gyula Donáth from 1903 in Bardejov spa in Bardejov and busts in Poltár and in Prešov. Also Elisabeth Bridge connecting towns Komárno in Slovakia and Komárom in Hungary (which used to be one town at the time when it was built), which was built in 1892 is named after Sissi.

Other statues in memory of Empress Elisabeth were erected in Salzburg, in the garden of the former Hotel Strauch in Feldafing, where she used to stay on her later travels, in Budapest, in Funchal on Madeira, and in many other places.

Portrayal of Elisabeth in the arts

Stage
In 1932 the comic operetta Sissi premiered in Vienna. Composed by Fritz Kreisler, the libretto was written by Ernst and Hubert Marischka, with orchestrations by Robert Russell Bennett. Although the pet name of the empress was always spelled "Sisi," never "Sissi," this incorrect version of her name persisted in the works about her that followed.

In 1943 Jean Cocteau wrote a play about an imagined meeting between Elisabeth and her assassin, L'Aigle à deux têtes (The Eagle with Two Heads). It was first staged in 1946.

In 1992, the musical Elisabeth premièred at the Theater an der Wien in Vienna. With libretto by Michael Kunze and music by Sylvester Levay, this is probably the darkest portrayal of the Empress' life. It portrayed Elisabeth bringing a physical manifestation of death with her to the imperial court, thus destroying the Habsburg dynasty. The leading role in the premiere was played by Dutch musical singer Pia Douwes. Elisabeth went on to become the most successful German-language musical of all time and has enjoyed numerous productions around the world.

Ballet
In his 1978 ballet Mayerling, Kenneth MacMillan portrayed Elisabeth in a pas de deux with her son Prince Rudolf, the principal character in the ballet.

In 1993 French ballerina Sylvie Guillem appeared in a piece entitled, Sissi, l'impératice anarchiste (Sissi, Anarchist Empress), choreographed by Maurice Béjart to Strauss's Emperor Waltz.

Film
The 1921 film Kaiserin Elisabeth von Österreich was one of the first films to focus entirely on Elisabeth. It was co-written by Elisabeth's niece, Marie Larisch (who played her younger self at the age of 62), and starred Carla Nelsen as the title character. The film later achieved notoriety when a group of con-artists started selling stills from the murder scene as actual photographs of the crime.

Adolf Trotz directed the 1931 German film Elisabeth of Austria.

In 1936, Columbia Pictures released The King Steps Out, a film version of the operetta "Sissi", directed by Josef von Sternberg. It starred opera diva Grace Moore and Franchot Tone.

Jean Cocteau directed the 1948 film version of his play The Eagle with Two Heads. Michelangelo Antonioni's 1981 film The Mystery of Oberwald is another adaptation of Cocteau's play.

In the German and Italian-speaking world, Elisabeth's name is often associated with a trilogy of romantic films about her life directed by Ernst Marischka which starred a teenage Romy Schneider and made her famous worldwide:
 Sissi (1955)
 Sissi — die junge Kaiserin (1956) (Sissi — The Young Empress)
 Sissi — Schicksalsjahre einer Kaiserin (1957) (Sissi — Fateful Years of an Empress)
 Forever My Love is a condensed version, with the three films edited down into one feature and dubbed in English. This version was released in North America in 1962.

In early dramatizations, Elisabeth appears as peripheral to her husband and son, and so is always shown as a mature character. Schneider's characterization of Elisabeth as a young woman is the first time the "young" empress is seen on screen. The trilogy was the first to explicitly depict the romantic myth of Sissi, and ends abruptly with her determination to live a private life. Any further exploration of the topic would have been at odds with the accepted image of the loving wife, devoted mother, and benevolent empress. The three films, newly restored, are shown every Christmas on Austrian, German, Dutch, and French television. In 2007, the films were released as The Sissi Collection with English subtitles. Schneider came to loathe the role, claiming, "Sissi sticks to me like porridge." Later she appeared as a much more realistic and fascinating Elisabeth in Luchino Visconti's Ludwig, a 1972 film about Elisabeth's cousin, Ludwig II of Bavaria. A portrait of Schneider in this film was the only one, taken from her roles, which is displayed in her home.

Ava Gardner played the empress in the 1968 film Mayerling, in which Omar Sharif starred as Crown Prince Rudolf.

A 1991 French-German film called  ( Sisi und der Kaiserkuss) starred French actress Vanessa Wagner as Sisi, Nils Tavernier as Emperor Franz Joseph and Sonja Kirchberger as Helene.

An indirect reference to Elisabeth is made in the 2004 film Phantom of the Opera. The heroine Christine (portrayed by Emmy Rossum) wears an elaborate white/silver ball gown in her first leading role, with diamond stars in her long, dark hair. The ensemble is modeled after Elisabeth’s attire and hairstyle in the iconic Winterhalter portrait.

In 2007, German comedian and director Michael Herbig released a computer-animated parody film based on Elisabeth under the title Lissi und der wilde Kaiser (lit.: "Lissi and the Wild Emperor"). It is based on his Sissi parody sketches featured in his television show Bullyparade. In Bullyparade – Der Film (2017), Elisabeth is played by Herbig.

A recent appearance of Sisi was in the new 2012 biopic about Ludwig II of Bavaria titled Ludwig II, where she was played by Hannah Herzsprung.

In December 2014, to coincide with the presentation of the Pre-Fall 2015 'Metier d'arts' collection by luxury fashion house Chanel, shown in the Schloss Leopoldskron palace, creative director Karl Lagerfeld directed a short film featuring Cara Delevingne as Empress Elisabeth accompanied by Pharrell Williams. During a dream sequence, the duo sing a song written by Williams entitled CC the World, playing on the iconic interlocking logo of the fashion house, the initials of its founder Coco Chanel, as well as the Empress's nickname 'Sisi'. Lagerfeld recreated the iconic gown worn by Elisabeth in the portrait by Winterhalter, whilst Pharrell takes on attire similar to Franz Joseph.

The 2022 film Corsage directed by Marie Kreutzer focuses on Empress Elisabeth's life following her 40th birthday celebrations. The film premiered at the 2022 Cannes Film Festival within the Un certain regard section and actress Vicky Krieps, who played the Empress, was awarded ex aequo the Best Performance Prize.

The 2023 Austrian-German-Swiss film Sisi & I directed by Frauke Finsterwalder and starring Sandra Hüller, Susanne Wolff, Tom Rhys Harries and Angela Winkler, tells the story of Empress Elisabeth from the point of view of her lady-in-waiting, Irma Sztáray, with Wolff playing the role of Empress Elisabeth and Hüller in the role of Sztáray. The film is expected to be released in Germany on 16 March 2023.

Television
Elisabeth was portrayed in episode 1 of the 1974 British television series Fall of Eagles. Diane Keen played the young Elisabeth and Rachel Gurney portrayed the empress at the time of Rudolf's death.

The 1992 BBC adaptation of Agatha Christie's Miss Marple mystery The Mirror Crack'd from Side to Side centers around the shooting of a fictitious film about Elisabeth. The role of the actress portraying the empress was played by Claire Bloom.

The season five finale of the Austrian detective television series Kommissar Rex (1994) revolves around a deluded woman affected by myth of the empress. The episode, appropriately, is entitled, "Sisi."

A heavily fictionalized version of Elisabeth's younger years is portrayed in a 1997 animated children's series, Princess Sissi.

Arielle Dombasle portrayed Elisabeth in the 2004 French television film Sissi, l'impératrice rebelle, detailing the last five days of her life.

Sandra Ceccarelli portrayed an older Elisabeth in the 2006 television dramatization of the Mayerling Incident, The Crown Prince. Her son and his lover were played by Max von Thun and Vittoria Puccini.

In December 2009, Sisi, a two-part mini-series, premiered on European television, produced by a German, Austrian and Italian partnership, starring Cristiana Capotondi as Elisabeth and David Rott as Emperor Franz Joseph. Like the 1997 animated series, this film portrays the romantic mythology surrounding the unhappy marriage of Elisabeth and Franz Joseph, but the political problems of the empire and the personal troubles of the main characters are dealt with in much better detail than in many other dramas.

In October 2015 an Italian cartoon series Sissi: La Giovane Imperatrice (Sissi: The Young Empress) began broadcasting on Mondo TV. In 2018 after airing two seasons totalling 56 episodes (26 minutes each, with 52 shorter 11-minute episodes slated for its 3D third season) it sold its second season to JeemTV, after already having ported it to TV Azteca in 2017.

In the 2021 miniseries Sisi,  aired on RTL, she was played by Dominique Devenport.

In the 2022 Netflix miniseries The Empress, centering on Sissi's life, she is played by Turkish German actress Devrim Lingnau.

Literature
A highly readable biography of Elisabeth is “Golden Fleece,” by Bertita Harding (Bobbs-Merrill, 1937), one of five biographies by Harding about members of the Habsburg dynasty. 

Constantin Christomanos (1867–1911) who served as Elisabeth's modern Greek language tutor from 1891 to 1893 and escorted her during her stay in Corfu, published his memoirs of her shortly after her death, in his 1899 Tagebuchblätter (Diary Pages). Although he portrayed Elisabeth in an idealistic favourable manner as a fairytale princess come to life, his book greatly displeased the Imperial Court that declared him persona non grata and forced him to resign his University teaching position in Vienna and leave Austria.

In September 2022, Netflix released The Empress, a six-episode series dramatizing Elisabeth's life. A companion novel, also titled The Empress, will publish in tandem with the show. The novel is written by Gigi Griffis.

The story of Elisabeth is told in Susan Appleyard's 2016 ebook, In a Gilded Cage.

Elisabeth's youth and early adult life are dramatized in the novel Imperial Waltz by William S. Abrahams (Dial Press, 1954).

Elisabeth appears as a significant character in Gary Jennings' 1987 novel Spangle. The novel concerns a circus traveling through Europe at the close of the 19th century, and portrays Elisabeth's interest in circuses and daredevil horseback riding.

Her story inspired the 2003 children's book The Royal Diaries: Elisabeth, The Princess Bride set during her teenage years in 1853 and 1854.

The empress appears in the 1976 romantic fiction novel Stars in my Heart by Barbara Cartland.

She features in Alexander Lernet-Holenia's 1960 novel Mayerling.

She appears in a cameo in the short story "The Road to Charing Cross" in the book Flashman and the Tiger by George MacDonald Fraser (1999). She dances with the anti-hero, Harry Flashman at a ball at the end of the story, in which Flashman has helped prevent her husband the Emperor from being assassinated.

Mark Twain (a.k.a. Samuel Clemens) wrote about the assassination of the Empress of Austria in an article entitled "The Memorable Assassination," which he did not submit for publication.

The Empress haunts a deadly Christmas house party in the form of a chatty biography, Life of the Empress Elizabeth of Austria, in Georgette Heyer's mystery, Envious Casca (1941). The book and its disappearance form part of the goings-on that drive the various family members and guests to distraction.

Author Allison Pataki wrote a historical fiction novel about Elisabeth and her marriage to Emperor Franz Joseph entitled The Accidental Empress, in February 2015. Its sequel, Sisi, Empress on Her Own,  was published in March 2016.

Journalist Jennifer Bowers Bahney wrote the non-fiction narrative of the theft of the Koechert diamond and pearl jewel titled Stealing Sisi's Star: How a Master Thief Nearly Got Away with Austria's Most Famous Jewel, published by McFarland & Co., June 2015.

In 1988, historian Brigitte Hamann wrote The Reluctant Empress: A Biography of Empress Elisabeth of Austria, reviving interest in Franz Joseph's consort. Unlike previous portrayals of Elisabeth as a one-dimensional fairy tale princess, Hamann portrayed her as a bitter, unhappy woman full of self-loathing and suffering from various emotional and mental disorders. She was seen to have searched for happiness, but died a broken woman who never found it. Hamann's portrayal explored new facets of the legend of Sisi, as well as contemplating the role of women in high-level politics and dynasties. 

Elisabeth and her purported lover, George "Bay" Middleton are included in the 2014 historical fiction novel, The Fortune Hunter by Daisy Goodwin.

Music
Dutch singer Petra Berger's album Eternal Woman includes "If I Had a Wish", a song about Elisabeth.

The song "SiSi" by the Scottish band Washington Irving is inspired by Elisabeth's life.

Architecture
The Empress Elisabeth Bridge over the Elbe, opened in 1855, was named after her.
The Elizabeth Church in Lviv, Ukraine (now the Greek Catholic Church of Sts. Olha and Elizabeth, Lviv), was founded in 1903 by the Emperor in memory of Elisabeth.

Honours
 : Grand Cross of the Imperial Order of Saint Catherine, October 1853
 : Dame of the Order of Queen Maria Luisa, 16 June 1854
  Mexican Empire: Grand Cross of the Imperial Order of Saint Charles, 10 April 1865
 : Dame Grand Cross of the Venerable Order of Saint John of Jerusalem, 23 May 1873 
  Kingdom of Prussia: Dame of the Order of Louise, 1st Class
 : Grand Cordon of the Order of the Precious Crown, 8 September 1898 (nominated, but never formally invested due to her death)

Genealogy
Ancestors

Issue

References

Bibliography
 Nicole Avril: L'impératrice, Paris, 1993
 Jennifer Bowers Bahney: Stealing Sisi's Star: How a master thief nearly got away with Austria's most famous jewel, (McFarland & Co., 2015
Philippe Collas: Louis II de Bavière et Elisabeth d'Autriche, âmes sœurs, Éditions du Rocher, Paris/Monaco 2001

 : Diaries (Tagebuchblätter, several editions in Modern Greek, German, French)
 Count Corti: Elizabeth, Empress of Austria (Thornton Butterworth: 1936)
 Barry Denenburg: The Royal Diaries: Elisabeth, The Princess Bride (Austria, 1853)
 Stefan Haderer: Im Schatten Homers. Kaiserin Elisabeth in Griechenland. (NeoPubli: 2021)
 Stefan Haderer: Under the Spell of a Myth: Empress Sisi in Greece (KDP Publishing: 2022)
 Stefan Haderer: "Where an Empress used to lodge: Imperial Residences of Empress Elisabeth of Austria", Royalty Digest Quarterly, Vol. 01/2009, Rosvall Royal Books, Falköping 2009 (44 pp.).
 Stefan Haderer: 'Empress Elisabeth's Final Odyssey", European Royal History Journal, Issue 64, Vol. 11.4, August 2008, Eurohistory, Arturo Beéche, East Richmond Heights, Calif.
 Brigitte Hamann: The Reluctant Empress: A Biography of Empress Elisabeth of Austria (Knopf: 1986) (410pp.).
 Brigitte Hamann: Sissi, Elisabeth, Empress of Austria (Taschen America: 1997) (short, illustrated).
 Bertita Harding: Italic textGolden Fleece: The Story of Franz Joseph and Elisabeth of Austria (Bobbs-Merrill, 1937). 
 Ann Nibbs: The Elusive Empress (Youwriteon.com: 2008) (372pp).
 Maura E. Hametz and Heidi Schlipphacke: 'Sissi's World: The Empress Elisabeth in Memory and Myth' (Bloomsbury: 2018) (408 pp.). 
 Matt Pavelich: Our Savage (Shoemaker & Hoard: 2004) (270 pp.).
 Matteo Tuveri: "Elizabeth of Austria: A Beauvoirian perspective", Simone de Beauvoir Studies, Volume 24, 2007–2008, Published by the Simone de Beauvoir Society (California)
 Matteo Tuveri: Sissi: Myth and history, Journal Eco delle Dolomiti, Pinzolo (TN), Italy.
 Matteo Tuveri: Sissi becomes Lissy, L'Unione Sarda, 6 gennaio 2009, p. 40, Cagliari
 Matteo Tuveri: Specchi ad angoli obliqui. Diario poetico di Elisabetta d'Austria, Aracne, Rome, 2006
 Matteo Tuveri: Tabularium. Considerazioni su Elisabetta d'Austria, Aracne, Rome, 2007

External links

 Empress Elisabeth – Sisi
 Web site of the Italian biographer Matteo Tuveri: www.matteotuveri.it
 Sisi Museum of Vienna
 YouTube: Inner visit to Sisi Museum in Hofburg Palace, Vienna (min. 3:30)
 Empress Elisabeth at Tripod.com
 Sissi: myth and history – by Matteo Tuveri
 Elisabeth as a Young Mother and Wife
 The Empress was Assassinated
 What Happened to the Young Elisabeth at the Wedding night?
 The Land of Queen Elisabeth – The Royal Palace of Gödöllő

|-

|-

 
1837 births
1898 deaths
1898 murders in Europe
19th-century Austrian people
Assassinated royalty
Assassinated Austrian people
Austrian empresses
Austrian people murdered abroad
Austrian Roman Catholics
Austrian people of German descent
Austrian expatriates in Hungary
Bohemian queens consort
Burials at the Imperial Crypt
Deaths by stabbing in Switzerland
Duchesses in Bavaria
Female murder victims
German Roman Catholics
House of Habsburg-Lorraine
House of Wittelsbach
Hungarian queens consort
Lombardic queens consort
Murdered royalty
Nobility from Munich
People murdered in Switzerland
Grand Cordons of the Order of the Precious Crown
Dames Grand Cross of the Order of St John
1898 murders in Switzerland